Singles Collection Volume 3 is a compilation album by the American garage rock band Thee Oh Sees, released in 2013 on Castle Face Records. The album collects various "one-offs, covers, and rarities," released by the band between 2011 and 2013.

Reception
In a positive review for Pitchfork, Jayson Greene praised the accessible nature of the compilation and its predecessor, Singles Collection Vol 1 & 2: "The Singles Collections are a periodic Hoover vac-ing of the couch-cushion change that tumbles from view during John Dwyer's frantic music dispersal, but they are also a service to people on the sidelines like us. They make an excellent tasting-platter way to engage with a band that usually demands steak-for-two (for one) levels of commitment."

Track listing

References

2013 compilation albums
Oh Sees albums
Castle Face Records albums